Xiaogang may refer to:

People with the given name
Feng Xiaogang, Chinese film director
Ye Xiaogang, Chinese composer of contemporary classical music
Zhang Xiaogang, contemporary Chinese symbolist and surrealist painter
Yu Xiaogang, Chinese environmentalist
Xiao Gang (born 1958), Chinese businessman

Locations
 Xiaogang, Anhui, a village in Xiaoxihe, Fengyang County, Chuzhou, Anhui, China
 Siaogang District (小港區), also spelled Xiaogang, Kaohsiung, Taiwan

Chinese given names